Perry Chen is an American artist and entrepreneur known for being the creator and principal founder of Kickstarter, PBC, the online funding platform for creative projects. He came up with the idea for Kickstarter in 2001 and launched it in 2009 along with co-founders Charles Adler and Yancey Strickler.

Education

Chen is an alumnus of Hunter College High School in New York City and Tulane University in New Orleans.

Work
Chen co-founded the Southfirst gallery in Brooklyn in 2001, was a TED Fellow in 2010, a resident of Laboratorio para la Ciudad in Mexico City in 2014, and is a 2016 Director's Fellow at the MIT Media Lab. In 2017, he was appointed to the Knight Commission on Trust, Media and American Democracy — a nonpartisan commission of leaders across media, technology, and public policy tasked with guiding the public discourse on rebuilding trust in America's democratic institutions.

In 2013, he was honored on the annual list of Time's 100 most influential people.

In 2014, Chen stepped down as chief executive officer of Kickstarter and left the role to co-founder Yancey Strickler. December 2014, Chen exhibited "Computers in Crisis" for the New Museum's First Look program, co-presented by Rhizome and Creative Time Reports. The exhibition included the event Y2K+15, an exploration of the phenomenon and legacy of Y2K, held at the New Museum. In 2017, Chen returned again as CEO where he remained until March 2019. He continues to serve as chairman of Kickstarter's board.

See also
 Tech companies in the New York metropolitan area

References

External links
Perry Chen Studio
 Kickstarter

Living people
Artists from New York City
American artists of Chinese descent
American chief executives of financial services companies
American financial company founders
American technology chief executives
American technology company founders
Businesspeople from New York City
Hunter College High School alumni
1976 births